Gunsel is a surname and given name which may refer to:

 Austin Gunsel (1909–1974), interim commissioner of the National Football League
 Irfan Günsel (born 1981), Turkish Cypriot businessman
 Selda Gunsel, Turkish American mechanical engineer
 Suat Günsel (born 1952), billionaire Turkish Cypriot entrepreneur, businessman and founder of the Near East University
 Günsel Renda, Turkish art historian